The Provincial Congress of New Jersey was a transitional governing body of the Province of New Jersey in the early part of the American Revolution. It first met in 1775 with representatives from all New Jersey's then-thirteen counties, to supersede the Royal Governor. In June 1776, this congress had authorized the preparation of a constitution, which was written within five days, adopted by the Provincial Congress, and accepted by the Continental Congress. The Constitution of 1776 provided for a bicameral legislature consisting of a General Assembly with three members from each county and a legislative council with one member from each county. All state officials, including the governor, were to be appointed by the Legislature under this constitution. The Vice-President of Council would succeed the Governor (who was the President of the Council) if a vacancy occurred in that office. The Provincial Congress ceased to function when the first session of the new Legislature convened on August 27, 1776, under the New Jersey State Constitution it had prepared.

1775 Sessions
The Provincial Congress met in late May, June and August at Trenton. During their sessions in the first week, they elected from their members Hendrick Fisher, as the body's President, Jonathan D. Sergeant, as secretary, and William Paterson and Frederick Frelinghuysen assistants.  The members, or "deputies" of the Congress, were received at its first session on 23 May 1775.

Members of the Provincial Congress
Three Provincial Congress deputies, Abraham Clark, John Hart and the Reverend John Witherspoon signed the Declaration of Independence.

 X = Attended Session
 N = Elected but did not attend Session

See also
Colonial government in the Thirteen Colonies (Council and Assembly)
Provincial Congress
New Jersey Legislature

References

Notes

Further reading
 Kemmerer, Donald L. (1940). Path to Freedom, The Struggle for Self Government in Colonial New Jersey 1703-1776. Princeton: Princeton University Press.
 McCormick, Richard P. (1964, 1970). New Jersey from Colony to State, 1609-1789. 1st Edition-Princeton: Van Nostrand; 2nd Edition—New Brunswick, New Jersey: Rutgers University Press.

External links
Historical Information. New Jersey Legislature official website

 
Government of New Jersey
New Jersey in the American Revolution
New Jersey
1775 establishments in New Jersey
1776 disestablishments in New Jersey
New Jersey